Herbert James Hagerman (December 15, 1871 – January 28, 1935) was an American attorney, was the 17th Governor of the New Mexico Territory from 1906 to 1907.

Early life and education
Hagerman was born in Milwaukee, Wisconsin to industrialist J. J. Hagerman. He worked at several low-level jobs in his father's businesses during his teen and college years, including his father's ranch near Roswell, New Mexico.

He received his law degree from Cornell Law School in 1894, and became a member of the Kappa Alpha Society.  After passing the bar, he practiced law in Colorado, where he had moved in order to be closer to his father's mining interests.

Hagerman never married and had no children.

Career
In 1898, became Secretary to the United States Embassy in Russia, a position he held until 1901. Working closely with Ambassador Ethan A. Hitchcock, Hagerman impressed his boss with his abilities and his eagerness to stem waste and corruption. Hitchcock was recalled to Washington in 1899 to serve as Secretary of the Interior.  Hagerman resumed practicing law and taking part in his father's New Mexico ranching interests.  In 1903 he was appointed to New Mexico's Board of Managers for the Louisiana Purchase Exposition, also known as the St. Louis World's Fair.  He was an alternate delegate to the 1904 Republican National Convention.

Governor of New Mexico Territory
In 1906 President Theodore Roosevelt was attempting to curb the political corruption which was rampant in New Mexico.  Remembering Hagerman's abilities from his time in Russia, and aware of Hagerman's ties to New Mexico, Hitchcock suggested him as a candidate for Governor. Roosevelt appointed Hagerman on January 10, 1906.

As Governor, Hagerman was strongly opposed by the political bosses of New Mexico. They waged a campaign of negative publicity against him, and succeeded in blocking most of his proposed reforms. The leaders of New Mexico's political establishment submitted a long list of spurious charges against Hagerman to Roosevelt. Roosevelt ultimately sided with the New Mexico establishment and asked Hagerman to resign. Roosevelt was inundated with pro-Hagerman letters and telegrams from the citizens of New Mexico, but did not reconsider his decision. Hagerman left office on May 3, 1907.

Law practice
After leaving office Hagerman returned to the practice of law in Santa Fe and Roswell. From 1923 to 1931 he served as federal commissioner to the Navajo nation, initially appointed by Albert Fall, a New Mexican who was serving as Secretary of the Interior.

Death and burial
Hagerman died in Santa Fe, New Mexico on January 28, 1935. He was buried at Forest Home Cemetery in Milwaukee, Wisconsin.

See also
 Thomas B. Catron
 Santa Fe Ring

References

External links 
 
 
 "The Russian Court" by Herbert J. Hagerman as published in The Century Illustrated Monthly Magazine, Volume LXX, May 1905 to October 1905, pp. 242–247
 History of New Mexico: Its Resources and People, Volume I by George B. Anderson, 1907, p. 278 regarding Hagerman and territorial land disposition under the Fergusson Act of 1898
 House Journal: Proceedings of the House of Representatives of the Territory of New Mexico, Thirty-Seventh Session, 1907 (p. 266) concerning House Resolution No. 19 calling for an investigation of Governor Hagerman alleging actions taken on behalf of the Pennsylvania Development Company
 Article "New Mexico: Political" in The New International Yearbook: A Compendium of the World's Progress for the Year 1907, edited by Frank Moore Colby, 1908 (p. 558) describing Hagerman's appointment and resignation as Governor of New Mexico
 A Statement in Regard to Certain Matters Concerning the Governorship and Political Affairs in New Mexico in 1906-1907 by Herbert J. Hagerman, 1908 self-published by Hagerman containing a series of letters exchanged between Hagerman, President Theodore Roosevelt, and others regarding controversies during Hagerman's term as Governor of New Mexico
 The Leading Facts of New Mexican History, Volume II by Ralph Emerson Twitchell, 1912 (p. 549) concerning controversies leading to the appointment of Hagerman as Governor of New Mexico and his subsequent resignation 
 Bull Moose Trails, Supplement to "Rooseveltian Fact and Fable", Chapter IV "How T.R. Fought the 'Bosses' of New Mexico in 1906-07" (pp. 78–102) by Annie Riley Hale, 1912
 The Student's History of New Mexico, Second Edition by L. Bradford Prince, 1921 (p. 151)
 Annual Report of the Secretary of the Interior for the Fiscal year Ended June 30 1921 by the U.S. Department of the Interior, p. 41 referencing discovery of oil in the Hogback structure of the Navajo Reservation and Hagerman's involvement, as Commissioner to the Navajos, in the formation of a tribal council
 Minutes of the Navajo Tribal Council held July 7, 1925 led by Hagerman and discussing preservation of Canyon de Chelly as a National Monument. Also see Canyon de Chelly National Monument Administrative History, Chapter 2
 Dancing Gods: Indian Ceremonials of New Mexico and Arizona by Erna Fergusson, 1931 (p. 130) referencing Hagerman's term as Commissioner to the Navajos

1871 births
1935 deaths
Politicians from Milwaukee
Cornell University alumni
Governors of New Mexico Territory
Lawyers from Milwaukee
New Mexico lawyers
New Mexico Republicans
People from Roswell, New Mexico